Michele "Big Mike" Miranda (July 26, 1896 – July 16, 1973) was a longtime member and eventual consigliere of the Genovese crime family and one of the most powerful New York gangsters in the 1950s and 1960s.

Early years
Born in San Giuseppe Vesuviano, Province of Naples, Miranda immigrated with his family to the United States in 1905 and settled in New York. In later years, Miranda's official residence was in Forest Hills, Queens. Becoming involved in crime as a teenager, his first arrest was for petty theft and assault in 1915. During Prohibition, Miranda became an associate of Gaetano "Tommy Brown" Lucchese and was affiliated with the Reina crime family of the Bronx.  In 1931, following the end of the Castellammarese War, he became close to Luciano crime family underboss, Vito Genovese and became a made man, or full member, of that crime family.

Enforcer for Luciano and Genovese
Miranda frequently acted as enforcer for Charles "Lucky" Luciano and Genovese along with the occasional hit for the crime family. As the decade progressed, Miranda kept rising through the family ranks. In the 1940s, Miranda used his former ties with Lucchese as a stepping stone in becoming the Luciano family's overseer of their activities in Manhattan's Garment District. After the execution of Louis "Lepke" Buchalter in 1944, Lucchese took control of Buchalter's garment industry rackets for the Lucchese crime family.

Reaching the Top Rank
Miranda soon became one of the top Capos in the family, a highly respected and feared gangster. Miranda had criminal interests in illegal gambling, loansharking, and labor racketeering.  Throughout this period, Miranda kept close ties to his mentor and one of the top bosses in the family, Genovese. On May 2, 1957, Genovese ordered the assassination of Luciano crime family boss, Frank Costello. Even though the hit failed, Costello soon retired from the family, leaving Genovese in control. Genovese named Miranda as consigliere, making him the number three man after Genovese and underboss Gerardo "Jerry" Catena.

On November 14, 1957, Miranda, Genovese, Catena, and about 60 other Mafia bosses were apprehended by federal agents at the famous Apalachin Conference in Apalachin, New York.

Genovese in Prison
In 1958, Genovese was indicted on narcotics charges and sentenced to 15 years at the Atlanta Federal Penitentiary in Atlanta, Georgia. While serving his sentence, Genovese placed the family under the leadership of a "Three Man Ruling Panel", made up of acting boss Thomas "Tommy Ryan" Eboli, Catena, and Miranda. Genovese would relay orders from his prison cell to the panel members as they ran the day-to-day family activities.

Law enforcement continued to pursue Miranda and other Mafia bosses.  In October 1965, the New York Police Department (NYPD) arrested Miranda and Eboli for parole violations of consorting with known criminals, but all the men were released within a week. On September 22, 1966, Miranda and 12 other high level Mafia members, including bosses from New York, New Orleans, and Florida were arrested at the La Stella Restaurant in Queens, New York. Miranda was once again charged with consorting with known criminals.  Each man had to put up $100,000 bail, a total of $1.3 million for all 13 men.

Retirement
In 1972, Miranda retired from active involvement in family affairs.  On July 16, 1973, Michele Miranda died of natural causes in Boca Raton, Florida. He is buried at Saint John Cemetery in Queens.

References

Sources
Fox, Stephen. Blood and Power: Organized Crime in Twentieth-Century America. New York: William Morrow and Company, 1989. 
Kelly, Robert J. Encyclopedia of Organized Crime in the United States. Westport, Connecticut: Greenwood Press, 2000. 
Sifakis, Carl. The Mafia Encyclopedia. New York: Da Capo Press, 2005. 
Sifakis, Carl. The Encyclopedia of American Crime. New York: Facts on File Inc., 2001. 
United States. Congress. House. Select Committee on Assassinations. Investigation of the Assassination of President John F. Kennedy. 
United States. Congress. Senate. Government Operations Committee. Organized Crime and Illicit Traffic in Narcotics. 1964. 

External links
Greater Astoria Historical Society - The Daily Star: Investigating the Mafia
US Mafia, Short History & Key Players
Attendee Profiles At The 1957 Apalachin Mob Confab By Mike La Sorte

1896 births
1973 deaths
People from the Province of Naples
American gangsters of Italian descent
Genovese crime family
People from Forest Hills, Queens
Consiglieri
Italian emigrants to the United States